The 2021 Austin FC season was the club's inaugural season in Major League Soccer, the top flight of soccer in the United States. This was also the first season a top-tier sports franchise is playing in the Greater Austin region.

Due to the ongoing COVID-19 pandemic, the season began on April 17, 2021, about a month and a half later than normal, and concluded on November 7, 2021. Outside of MLS, Austin FC would have competed in the 2021 U.S. Open Cup, but it was postponed indefinitely in April before being canceled in July.

Austin FC won their first match in Commerce City, CO against the Colorado Rapids 3-1, where midfielder Diego Fagundez scored the club's first ever goal. They played their first game in Austin in front of 20,738 fans, a 0-0 draw against the San Jose Earthquakes. They won their first home game against the Portland Timbers 4-1, a match which Austin FC winger Jon Gallagher scored the first ever MLS goal at Q2 Stadium.

Austin FC struggled in their inaugural campaign despite selling out all their home games. They finished 12th in the Western Conference with 9 wins, 4 draws, and 21 losses. Alexander Ring served as captain, and both Cecilio Dominguez and Diego Fagundez led the club with 7 goals.

Background

Season

8 games on the road 
Due to Q2 Stadium not being finished, Austin FC played their first 8 matches in club history all on the road. They lost their first match 2-0 against LAFC, but rallied to win their next 2 matches against the Colorado Rapids and Minnesota United FC 3-1 and 1-0 respectively. Midfielder Diego Fagundez scored the club's first goal in the 59th minute in Colorado, a match where Cecilio Dominguez notched the first brace in club history. Austin FC struggled after the win in Minnesota, scoring only 2 goals (both on road games in Kansas City) and gained 4 points - all draws - over their next 8 matches. They had scoring droughts of 389 minutes between May 9 and June 12, and 364 minutes between June 12 and July 1.

First games in Austin 
Austin played their first home match on June 19, a 0-0 draw against the San Jose Earthquakes in front of a sellout crowd of 20,738. After a quick 2-0 loss in Minnesota, the club was home for their next 6 matches. Jon Gallagher scored the first ever goal in Q2 Stadium in Austin's first home win, a 4-1 drubbing of the eventual Western Conference champion Portland Timbers. After losing 3 consecutive home games, they won their first ever Copa Tejas competition, a 3-2 win against the Dynamo where Tomás Pochettino scored his first MLS brace.

Austin FC also played their first ever international friendly, a 3-1 loss in Austin against Liga MX side Tigres UANL on July 13.

Reinforcements and further struggles 
Through the club's first 16 games, Austin only scored 13 goals. To kickstart their offense, they paid $1.65 million to sign Moussa Djitte from Grenoble and $7 million to sign Argentinian forward Sebastian Driussi from Zenit Saint Petersburg of the Russian Premier League. Driussi made his debut August 7 and scored his first goal in a 3-1 win against Portland on August 21. Despite nearly doubling their offensive output scoring 12 goals over a 7 game stretch, Austin had 1 win and 8 losses over 9 competitions from August 7 to September 18 following Driussi's debut.

End of the season 
While only having 19 points through 25 matches, Austin FC was still technically in the playoff race come October. On September 26, homegrown player McKinze Gaines became the first Austinite to score a goal for the club in a 2-0 upset win against the LA Galaxy. Even though they won 4 of their last 5 home matches, their lone loss against Minnesota eliminated them from postseason play on October 16. Despite the loss, Austin FC still had 2 more Copa Tejas matches. They defeated the Dynamo 2-1 on October 24 and could have secured the Cup with a win in Frisco against FC Dallas. However, they lost the contest 2-1, conceding the Cup winning goal to Franco Jara in the 80th minute. Austin FC ended their inaugural season on November 7, a 3-0 loss to the Timbers in Portland.

Diego Fagundez tied for the team lead in both goals with Cecilio Dominguez (7) and assists with Sebastian Driussi (5). He was selected as the team's offensive player of the year, while GK Brad Stuver was selected as the team's defensive player of the year, respectively. Stuver led the MLS with 134 saves in 2021.

Management team

Roster

.

Transfers

In

Loan In

Out

Loan out

MLS SuperDraft picks

Non-competitive fixtures

Preseason

Midseason

Competitive fixtures

Major League Soccer regular season

Standings

Western Conference

Overall

Matches

U.S. Open Cup 
 The first three games of the 2021 MLS season were originally going to serve as the qualification for MLS teams to the 2021 Lamar Hunt U.S. Open Cup. After these games were played, U.S. Soccer canceled the 2021 Lamar Hunt U.S. Open Cup due to COVID-19.

Qualification

Statistics

Appearances and goals

Numbers after plus–sign (+) denote appearances as a substitute.

Top scorers
{| class="wikitable" style="font-size: 95%; text-align: center;"
|-
!width=30|Rank
!width=30|Position
!width=30|Number
!width=175|Name
!width=75|
!width=75|
!width=75|Total
|-
|rowspan=2|1
|MF
|14
|align="left"|
|7
|0
|7
|-
|-
|FW
|10
|align="left"| Cecilio Domínguez
|7
|0
|7
|-
|3
|FW
|25
|align="left"| Sebastián Driussi
|5
|0
|5
|-
|4
|MF
|8
|align="left"| Alexander Ring
|4
|0
|4
|-
|5
|FW
|17
|align="left"| Jon Gallagher
|3
|0
|3 
|-
|rowspan=2|6
|MF
|7
|align="left"| Tomás Pochettino
|2
|0
|2 
|-
|DF
|18
|align="left"| Julio Cascante
|2
|0
|2 
|-
|rowspan=4|8
|DF
|16
|align="left"| Hector Jiménez
|1
|0
|1 
|-
|-
|FW
|18
|align="left"| Moussa Djitté
|1
|0
|1 
|-
|-
|FW
|18
|align="left"| McKinze Gaines
|1
|0
|1 
|-
|FW
|20
|align="left"| Jared Stroud
|1
|0
|1 
|-
!colspan="4"|Total
! 34
! 0
! 34

Top assists
{| class="wikitable" style="font-size: 95%; text-align: center;"
|-
!width=30|Rank
!width=30|Position
!width=30|Number
!width=175|Name
!width=75|
!width=75|
!width=75|
!width=75|Total
|-
|rowspan=2|1
|FW
|25
|align="left"| Sebastian Driussi
|5
|0
|0
|5
|-
|MF
|14
|align="left"| Diego Fagundez
|5
|0
|0
|5
|-
|rowspan=3|3
|MF
|10
|align="left"| Cecilio Domínguez
|4
|0
|0
|4
|-
|DF
|11
|align="left"| Žan Kolmanič
|4
|0
|0
|4
|-
|MF
|20
|align="left"| Jared Stroud
|4
|0
|0
|4
|-
|6
|DF
|24
|align="left"| Nick Lima
|3
|0
|0
|3
|-
|rowspan=4|7
|DF
|18
|align="left"| Julio Cascante
|2
|0
|0
|2
|-
|MF
|16
|align="left"| Hector Jimenez
|2
|0
|0
|2
|-
|MF
|7
|align="left"| Tomás Pochettino
|2
|0
|0
|2
|-
|MF
|8
|align="left"| Alexander Ring
|2
|0
|0
|2
|-
|rowspan=5|11
|MF
|6
|align="left"| Sebastian Berhalter
|1
|0
|0
|2
|-
|FW
|17
|align="left"| Jon Gallagher
|1
|0
|0
|1
|-
|FW
|9
|align="left"| Danny Hoesen
|1
|0
|0
|1
|-
|MF
|15
|align="left"| Daniel Pereira
|1
|0
|0
|1
|-
|FW
|11
|align="left"| Rodney Redes
|1
|0
|0
|1
|-
!colspan="4"|Total
!37
!0
!0
!37

Disciplinary record
{| class="wikitable" style="text-align:center;"
|-
| rowspan="2" !width=15|
| rowspan="2" !width=15|
| rowspan="2" !width=120|Player
| colspan="3"|MLS
| colspan="3"|MLS Cup
| colspan="3"|U.S. Open Cup
| colspan="3"|Total
|-
!width=34; background:#fe9;|
!width=34; background:#fe9;|
!width=34; background:#ff8888;|
!width=34; background:#fe9;|
!width=34; background:#fe9;|
!width=34; background:#ff8888;|
!width=34; background:#fe9;|
!width=34; background:#fe9;|
!width=34; background:#ff8888;|
!width=34; background:#fe9;|
!width=34; background:#fe9;|
!width=34; background:#ff8888;|
|-
|15
|MF
|align="left"| Daniel Pereira
|7||0||0||0||0||0||0||0||0||7||0||0
|-
|8
|MF
|align="left"| Alexander Ring
|3||1||1||0||0||0||0||0||0||3||1||1
|-
|8
|MF
|align="left"| Diego Fagundez
|5||0||0||0||0||0||0||0||0||5||0||0
|-
|3
|DF
|align="left"| Jhohan Romaña
|5||0||0||0||0||0||0||0||0||5||0||0
|-
|20
|MF
|align="left"| Jared Stroud
|5||0||0||0||0||0||0||0||0||5||0||0
|-
|18
|DF
|align="left"| Julio Cascante
|4||0||1||0||0||0||0||0||0||4||0||1
|-
|21
|DF
|align="left"| Žan Kolmanič
|4||0||0||0||0||0||0||0||0||4||0||0
|-
|24
|DF
|align="left"| Nick Lima
|4||0||0||0||0||0||0||0||0||4||0||0
|-
|10
|MF
|align="left"| Cecilio Dominguez
|3||0||0||0||0||0||0||0||0||3||0||0
|-
|7
|MF
|align="left"| Tomás Pochettino
|3||0||0||0||0||0||0||0||0||3||0||0
|-
|6
|MF
|align="left"| Sebastian Berhalter
|3||0||0||0||0||0||0||0||0||3||0||0
|-
|5
|DF
|align="left"| Matt Besler
|2||0||0||0||0||0||0||0||0||2||0||0
|-
|25
|FW
|align="left"| Sebastián Driussi
|2||0||0||0||0||0||0||0||0||2||0||0
|-
|16
|MF
|align="left"| Hector Jiménez
|2||0||1||0||0||0||0||0||0||2||0||1
|-
|41
|GK
|align="left"| Brad Stuver
|2||0||0||0||0||0||0||0||0||2||0||0
|-
|27
|FW
|align="left"| McKinze Gaines
|1||0||0||0||0||0||0||0||0||1||0||0
|-
|19
|DF
|align="left"| Freddy Kleemann
|1||0||0||0||0||0||0||0||0||1||0||0
|-
|4
|DF
|align="left"| Aedan Stanley
|1||0||0||0||0||0||0||0||0||1||0||0
|-
|21
|DF
|align="left"| Jon Gallagher
|1||0||0||0||0||0||0||0||0||1||0||0
|-
|colspan="3"|Total||58||1||3||0||0||0||0||0||0||58||1||3

End-of-season awards

Notes

References 

 

2021
Austin Fc
Austin Fc
Austin Fc